Araguaia Atlético Clube, also known as Araguaia, are a Brazilian football team from Alto Araguaia, Mato Grosso. They competed in the Série D in 2009.

History 
Araguaia Atlético Clube were founded on December 1, 1978. They won the Copa Governador do Mato Grosso in 2008, when they beat União in the final. Araguaia competed in the Série D in 2009, when they were eliminated in the quarterfinals by Chapecoense.

Stadium 
Araguaia play their home games at Bilinão. The stadium has a maximum capacity of 3,000 people.

Achievements 

 Copa Governador do Mato Grosso:
 Winners (1): 2008

References

External links 
  Official website

Association football clubs established in 1978
Football clubs in Mato Grosso
1978 establishments in Brazil